Being There is a 1979 American satire film directed by Hal Ashby. Based on the 1970 novel of the same name by Jerzy Kosiński, it was adapted for the screen by Kosiński and the uncredited Robert C. Jones. The film stars Peter Sellers, Shirley MacLaine and Melvyn Douglas and features Jack Warden, Richard Dysart, and Richard Basehart.

Douglas won the Academy Award for Best Supporting Actor and Sellers was nominated for Best Actor. The screenplay won the British Academy Film Award for Best Screenplay and the Writers Guild of America Award for Best Comedy Adapted from Another Medium. It was also nominated for the Golden Globe Award for Best Screenplay.

In 2015, the United States Library of Congress selected Being There for preservation in the National Film Registry, finding it "culturally, historically, or aesthetically significant".

Plot
Middle-aged, simple-minded Chance lives in the townhouse of a wealthy old man in Washington, D.C. He has spent his whole life tending the garden and has never left the property. Other than gardening, his knowledge is derived entirely from what he sees on television. When his benefactor dies, Chance naively tells the lawyers that he has no claim against the estate and is ordered to move out.

Chance wanders aimlessly, discovering the outside world for the first time. Passing by a TV shop, he sees himself captured by a video camera in the shop window. Entranced, he steps backward off the sidewalk and is struck by a chauffeured limousine owned by elderly business mogul Ben Rand. In the car is Rand's glamorous and much younger wife Eve, who mishears "Chance, the gardener" in reply to the question who he is, as "Chauncey Gardiner".

Eve brings Chance to their palatial estate to recover. He is wearing expensive tailored but outmoded clothes from the 1920s and 1930s, which his benefactor had allowed him to take from the attic, and his manners are old-fashioned and courtly. When Ben Rand meets him, he takes "Chauncey" for an upper-class, highly educated businessman who has fallen on hard times. Rand admires him, finding him direct, wise and insightful.

Rand is also a confidant and advisor to the President of the United States, whom he introduces to "Chauncey". In a discussion about the economy, Chance takes his cue from the words "stimulate growth" and talks about the changing seasons of the garden. The President misinterprets this as optimistic political advice and quotes "Chauncey Gardiner" in a speech. Chance now rises to national prominence, attends important events, develops a close connection with the Soviet ambassador, and appears on a television talk show during which his detailed advice about what a serious gardener should do is misunderstood as his opinion on what would be his presidential policy.

Though he has now risen to the pinnacle of Washington society, the Secret Service and some 16 other agencies are unable to find any background information on him. During this time Rand's personal physician, Dr. Allenby, becomes increasingly suspicious that Chance is not a wise political expert and that the mystery of his identity may have a more mundane explanation. Dr. Allenby considers telling Rand this, but remains silent when he realizes how happy Chance is making him in his final days.

The dying Rand encourages Eve to become close to "Chauncey". She is already attracted to him and makes a sexual advance. Chance has no interest in or knowledge of sex, but mimics a kissing scene from the 1968 film The Thomas Crown Affair, which happens to be showing on the TV. When the scene ends, Chauncey stops suddenly and Eve is confused. She asks what he likes, meaning sexually; he replies "I like to watch," meaning television. She is momentarily taken aback, but decides she is willing to masturbate for his voyeuristic pleasure, thereby not noticing that he has turned back to the TV and is now imitating a yoga exercise on a different channel.

Chance is present at Rand's death and shows genuine sadness at his passing. Questioned by Dr. Allenby, he admits that he "loves Eve very much" and also that he is just a gardener. When he leaves to inform Eve of Ben's death, Allenby says to himself, "I understand," but interpretation of that is left to the viewer.

While the President delivers a speech at Rand's funeral, the pallbearers hold a whispered discussion over potential replacements for the President in the next term of office and unanimously agree on Chauncey Gardiner as successor. Oblivious to all this, Chance wanders off through Rand's wintry estate. He straightens out a pine sapling flattened by a fallen branch, then walks across the surface of a lake. He pauses, dips his umbrella deep into the water under his feet, then continues on, while the President is heard quoting Rand: "Life is a state of mind."

Cast

 Peter Sellers as Chance the gardener (Chauncey Gardiner)
 Shirley MacLaine as Eve Rand
 Melvyn Douglas as Ben Rand
 Richard Dysart as Dr. Robert Allenby
 Jack Warden as the President
 Richard Basehart as Soviet Ambassador Vladimir Skrapinov
 Than Wyenn as Ambassador Gaufridi
 David Clennon as Thomas Franklin
 Fran Brill as Sally Hayes
 Ruth Attaway as Louise
 Denise DuBarry as Johanna
 Sam Weisman as Colson
 Alice Hirson as the First Lady
 Arthur Rosenberg as Morton Hull
 Jerome Hellman as Gary Burns
 James Noble as Kaufman
 John Harkins as Courtney
 Elya Baskin as Karpatov
 Richard McKenzie as Ron Steigler
 Oteil Burbridge as Lolo (boy on corner)
 Hoyt Clark Harris Jr. as Secret Service agent Riff

Production

Casting
Burt Lancaster was Ashby's first choice for the role of Ben Rand. Laurence Olivier was also considered for the role, but turned it down because of the masturbation scene.

Filming
Principal filming occurred at the Biltmore Estate, the largest private home in America, located in Asheville, North Carolina. 
According to MacLaine, "(Peter) believed he was Chauncey. He never had lunch with me... He was Chauncey Gardiner the whole shoot, but believing he was having a love affair with me." The original ending as written in the script was filmed; it shows Eve finding Chance by the lake, they declare they have found each other, and both walk back together. However, Ashby was unhappy with this ending so he had a platform submerged in the lake for Sellers to walk on, creating the film's enigmatic final scene.

Melvyn Douglas's granddaughter, Illeana Douglas, visited the set and met Peter Sellers, who is her favorite actor. She has since credited the film for inspiring her to pursue a career in acting. According to Illeana, Sellers and Douglas had known each other since the 1940s, when they first met in Burma during World War II. They often reminisced about their war days while on the set.
The making of the film is portrayed in The Life and Death of Peter Sellers, a biographical film of Sellers' life.

Music
Incidental music is used very sparingly. What little original music is used was composed by Johnny Mandel, and primarily features two recurrent piano themes based on "Gnossiennes" No. 4 and No. 5 by Erik Satie. The other major pieces of music used are the Eumir Deodato jazz/funk arrangement of the opening fanfare from Also Sprach Zarathustra and "Basketball Jones" by Cheech and Chong. These pieces respectively accompany the title credits and Chance's first arrival to the Biltmore Estate.

Mandel was also assisted by his cousin and fellow composer Miles Goodman with the orchestration of the film.

Reception and legacy
The film opened to positive reviews and gave Sellers a hit after many of his previous films outside of the Pink Panther series had flopped. Film critic Roger Ebert awarded a full grade of 4 out of 4 stars in his original print review. Gene Siskel also gave the film a perfect grade of 4 stars, calling it "one of those rare films, a work of such electric comedy that you are more likely to watch it in amazement than to break down and laugh." Janet Maslin of The New York Times called the film "a stately, beautifully acted satire with a premise that's funny but fragile."
 Variety called it "an unusually fine film" that "represents Peter Sellers' most smashing work since the mid-1960s." Kevin Thomas of the Los Angeles Times called it "a gentle, exquisitely funny film," adding, "Sellers hasn't been so terrific—or had such terrific material—in years."

Vincent Misiano reviewed Being There in Ares Magazine #3 and commented that "The film's humor never flags and yet its delicately bitter irony is never far away. It satirizes politics and politicians, business and businessmen, and, finally, all the rest of us and what we imagine we see when we look at one another." In his 2005 book The Great Movies II, Roger Ebert mentioned the reaction of his students to the final scene (which is unique to the film, not appearing in the book), stating that they once suggested that Chance may be walking on a submerged pier. But, Ebert writes "The movie presents us with an image, and while you may discuss the meaning of the image, it is not permitted to devise explanations for it. Since Ashby does not show a pier, there is no pier — a movie is exactly what it shows us, and nothing more."

The credits at the film's end roll over an outtake, known as the "Rafael outtake." Sellers was later displeased that the outtake ran because he believed it took away from Chauncey's mystique. He also believed the outtake was what prevented him from winning the Oscar.

The film holds a score of 95% on Rotten Tomatoes based on 55 reviews, with an average rating of 8.56/10. The critical consensus reads: "Smart, sophisticated, and refreshingly subtle, Being There soars behind sensitive direction from Hal Ashby and a stellar Peter Sellers performance." In 2003 The New York Times placed the film on its Best 1000 Movies Ever list.

Awards and nominations

The film is recognized by American Film Institute in:
 2000: AFI's 100 Years...100 Laughs – #26

Home media
A 30th Anniversary Edition was released on DVD and Blu-ray in February 2009. The Criterion Collection issued the film on DVD and Blu-ray in March 2017.

See also
 The Career of Nicodemus Dyzma: Being There is said to bear a strong resemblance to this 1932 Polish novel, and the film's originality became a subject of controversy in 1982. Monika Adamczyk-Garbowska wrote "most Polish critics immediately recognized his book as a version of Kariera Nikodema Dyzmy by Tadeusz Dolega-Mostowicz.
 Politics in fiction – a list of other fictional stories in which politics similarly features as an important plot element.
 Social effects of television

Notes

References

Bibliography

External links

Being There essay by Jerry Dean Roberts at National Film Registry.
 

 
 
 
Being There: American Cipher an essay by Mark Harris at the Criterion Collection
  "The 34 best political movies ever made", Ann Hornaday, The Washington Post Jan. 23, 2020, ranked No. 24

1979 films
1979 comedy-drama films
American black comedy films
American comedy-drama films
American political satire films
1970s English-language films
Films about fictional presidents of the United States
Films about television
Films about the media
Films based on American novels
Films directed by Hal Ashby
Films featuring a Best Musical or Comedy Actor Golden Globe winning performance
Films featuring a Best Supporting Actor Academy Award-winning performance
Films featuring a Best Supporting Actor Golden Globe winning performance
Films scored by Johnny Mandel
Films set in country houses
Films set in North Carolina
Films set in Washington, D.C.
Films shot in North Carolina
Films whose writer won the Best Screenplay BAFTA Award
United States National Film Registry films
1970s American films
Films about disability